Helen Meany (later Gravis, December 15, 1904 – July 21, 1991) was an American diver who competed at the 1920, 1924 and 1928 Summer Olympics. In 1920 she was eliminated in the first round of the 10 m platform competition. Four years later she finished fifth in the 10 m platform. In 1928 she won the gold medal in the 3 m springboard.

Meany was the first American female diver to compete at three Olympics. Domestically she won 17 AAU titles in 1920–1928, before appearing in paid exhibitions that disqualified her as an amateur. In September 1930 she married Harry Balfe. In 1971 she was inducted into the International Swimming Hall of Fame.

External links

1904 births
1991 deaths
Sportspeople from New York City
American female divers
Divers at the 1920 Summer Olympics
Divers at the 1924 Summer Olympics
Divers at the 1928 Summer Olympics
Olympic gold medalists for the United States in diving
Medalists at the 1928 Summer Olympics
20th-century American women
20th-century American people